Richard Cabeza (a.k.a. Richard Daemon) is a Swedish musician. He played bass in various death metal bands, including Unanimated, Dismember, Carbonized, and Murder Squad. He was also the vocalist of the band General Surgery. In 2002, Cabeza was the touring bassist of Dark Funeral. He currently resides in Dallas, Texas, where he formed the band Rape, Pillage and Burn.

References

Year of birth missing (living people)
Living people
Swedish heavy metal bass guitarists
Dismember (band) members
Murder Squad members
Carbonized members